Telmana may refer to:
Imeni Telmana,a village in the Chuy Region of Kyrgyzstan
Telmana, Leningrad Oblast, a logging depot settlement in the Leningrad Oblast in Russia